Whelton is a surname. Notable people with the surname include:

Bill Whelton (born 1959), American ice hockey player
Daniel A. Whelton (1872–1953), American politician
James Whelton, Irish computer programmer
Joe Whelton (born 1956), American basketball coach
Paul Whelton, American physician